World's Strongest Woman (later known as Strongwoman World Championships and World's Strongest Lady) is an annual strongwoman contest, and considered the pinnacle for female competitors and recognized as the world championships. The format was similar to the World's Strongest Man contest, and was held during the same time and same location as WSM from 2001 to 2003.

After the withdrawal of sponsors TWI and BBC, the International Federation of Strength Athletes replaced it with the Strongwoman World Championships from 2005 to 2008. The contest returned as the World's Strongest Lady in 2011, and from 2012- as the United Strongmen Women's World Championships.

Since 2019, the competition was held in Daytona Beach, United States.

Official results

Results courtesy of David Horne's World of Grip

Repeat champions

References

Strongmen competitions